The 2011 Huntington Hammer season was the first season for the Ultimate Indoor Football League (UIFL) franchise. The Hammer were able to finish the season with a 7–7 record. In the playoffs, they were defeated by the Eastern Kentucky Drillers.

The team was owned by principal owner, Cecil Vandyke, along with co-owners Bill Nichols and Rick Kranz. On January 6, 2011, Josh Resignalo was named the first head coach in Hammer history. Resignalo was relieved on his coaching duties following an April 9 loss to the Saginaw Sting. Defensive coordinator, Michael Owens, was named the interim head coach.

Schedule
Key:

Regular season

Postseason schedule

Standings

Final roster

References

Huntington Hammer
Huntington Hammer
2011 in sports in West Virginia